Fun Boy Three were an English new wave pop band, active from 1981 to 1983 and formed by singers Terry Hall, Neville Staple and Lynval Golding after they left the Specials. They released two albums and had seven UK top 20 hits.

History
Fun Boy Three reduced the ska sound that they and Jerry Dammers had crafted with great success with the Specials and initially took a more minimal approach with the focus on percussion and vocals. For their second album they assembled a six-piece backing group including a cellist and a trombone player, allowing the record to feature more diverse and expansive arrangements, and also enabling them to play live instead of being a purely studio group as previously. The band enjoyed six UK top 20 singles, starting with "The Lunatics (Have Taken Over the Asylum)" and including the top 10 hits "It Ain't What You Do (It's the Way That You Do It)", "Tunnel of Love" and "Our Lips Are Sealed". They created two albums of which the eponymous The Fun Boy Three was the more successful. The follow-up album Waiting, produced by Scottish-American singer David Byrne, was well-received critically.

Following the trio's last UK hit "Our Lips Are Sealed", co-written by Terry Hall and Jane Wiedlin of the Go-Go's, who had a U.S. hit with the song a year earlier, they then toured the United States and split afterwards.

They were credited with helping launch the career in 1982 of Bananarama, whom Hall first saw in The Face magazine. The three women provided credited chorus vocals on the hit "It Ain't What You Do (It's the Way That You Do It)"; the Fun Boy Three later sang on the Bananarama song "Really Saying Something", both reaching the top 5 in the UK.

Discography

Albums

Live albums
 Live on the Test (1994) (recorded 1983)

Compilation albums
 The Best of Fun Boy Three (1984)
 Fun Boy Three - The Best of (1996)
 Really Saying Something: The Best of Fun Boy Three (1997)
 Fun Boy Three/The Colourfield The Singles (1994)

Singles

References

External links
 
 

English new wave musical groups
English pop music groups
British musical trios
Musical groups from Coventry
Chrysalis Records artists
Political music groups
Musical groups established in 1981
Musical groups disestablished in 1983
1981 establishments in England
1983 disestablishments in England